The Polytechnic Institute of Clermont-Auvergne (Clermont Auvergne INP) (Institut national polytechnique Clermont-Auvergne, Groupe Clermont Auvergne INP) is a French technological university system consisting of three engineering schools:

 École polytechnique universitaire de Clermont-Auvergne ;
 Institut d'informatique d'Auvergne ; 
 SIGMA Clermont.

The institute is a Établissement public à caractère scientifique, culturel et professionnel.

Clermont Auvergne INP schools award engineering degrees in training areas such as computer science, chemistry, chemical engineering, mechanical engineering, biological engineering, electrical engineering, applied mathematics, systems engineering production, physical engineering or industrial engineering.

References

External links
 Clermont Auvergne INP official site

Engineering universities and colleges in France
Research institutes in France
Technical universities and colleges in France
Universities and colleges in Clermont-Ferrand
Grandes écoles
2021 establishments in France